Solidão is a city  in the state of Pernambuco, Brazil.

Geography

 State - Pernambuco
 Region - Sertão Pernambucano
 Boundaries - Paraiba state (North and West);  Afogados da Ingazeira and Carnaíba (South);  Tabira (East).
 Area - 
 Elevation - 
 Hydrography - Pajeú River
 Vegetation - Caatinga  hiperxerófila
 Climate - semi arid - (Sertão) hot
 Annual average temperature - 
 Distance to Recife -

Economy

The main economic activities in Solidão are based in agribusiness, especially creation of goats, cattle, chickens; and plantations of corn and beans.

Economic Indicators

Economy by Sector
2006

Health Indicators

References

Municipalities in Pernambuco